"I Get It In" is a single by rapper 50 Cent. It was initially released as the official second single from Before I Self Destruct, but it was later replaced by "Do You Think About Me".

Background
The song is produced by Dr. Dre. The unmixed version was leaked by Hot 97's Funkmaster Flex on January 5. The mix version was originally posted for a January 12 release date but was delayed to January 15 for unknown reason. The single was first released to 50 Cent's official personal internet community. The song was officially released to online music stores on February 10, 2009. The single was released online one week after his single "Crack a Bottle" with Eminem and Dr. Dre. Aftermath Entertainment collaborator Dawaun Parker has  stated that he is also featured on the song.

Track listing
Digital single

Chart performance 
After the week of the song's release, the single debuted on the Billboard Hot R&B/Hip-Hop Songs at #64, since then it has peaked at #43. On the Hot Rap Tracks it peaked at #16. On the Billboard Rhythmic Top 40 it peaked at #33. On the Billboard Mainstream R&B/Hip-Hop chart it peaked at #29. After its iTunes release it made a "Hot Shot Debut" at #53 on the Billboard Hot 100 based on downloads. In Canada it debuted at #52 on the Canadian Hot 100 based on digital downloads.

Charts

References

50 Cent songs
2009 singles
Songs written by 50 Cent
Song recordings produced by Dr. Dre
Shady Records singles
Aftermath Entertainment singles
Interscope Records singles
Songs written by Mark Batson
2009 songs